Pei Hwa Independent High School (simplified Chinese: 培华独立中学; traditional Chinese: 培華獨立中學;Malay language: Sekolah Menengah Persendirian Pei Hwa) is a Chinese independent high school located in Sungai Mati, Tangkak District, Johor, Malaysia. Pei Hwa High School was established in 1929 by Cai Jing San, Zheng Qing Mou, Li Hui Mu, Zhang Yu Cai, Liu Guang Wen, Cai Qi Zheng, Chen Shu, Li Guo Zhu (transliteration) and others. Pei Hwa High School was one of the minorities of schools that decided to remain apart from Malaysia national school system. It was set up with the main intention of providing education in the Chinese language. Being an independent school, the school does not receive funding from the Malaysian government and needs to sustain itself through student fees and donations from the public.

Students in the school study in three junior middle levels and three senior middle levels, similar to the secondary school systems in mainland China and Taiwan; each level usually takes one year. Like the students in public secondary schools, students in the school are put into several streams like Science or Art/Commerce in the senior middle levels. They take standardised tests known as the Unified Examination Certificate (UEC) at the end of Junior Middle 3 and Senior Middle 3.

History

1929–1946 
Pei Hwa Primary School was established in 1929 by local enthusiasts is located at Yu Yuan Huo Jiao Chang, San Jiao Bu. Later, the school moved to Kwang Tung Association. The student population increased so much that the school borrowed premises from Chinese Rubber Trade Association as the second school building in 1936. At the same time, Tai Chang Company contributed a piece of land and the school also purchased a piece of land for building purpose, the school space increased to 4 acres. In 1938, the school moved to its new building; the number of students was around 140.

Following the Japanese occupation of Malaysia in 1942, the school was forced to stop classes, all the school equipment was destroyed. In 1946, classes resumed.

1947–1962 
With the development of the school and the demands of society, the school opened upper primary classes in 1947. In 1949, the school started enrolling junior middle one's students, secondary education was begun and school gradually increased in size. Lack of school buildings to expand the school construction projects in full swing. By 1958, the number of the students is over 1,000, due to lack of facilities, primary and secondary schools are forced to have double shifts, morning and afternoon shifts, minimising the hours children spend in school. The primary school is quite separate from secondary school in the same year. Primary school moved to their present location at second year, now namely Sekolah Jenis Kebangsaan Cina Pei Hwa (SJK(C) Pei Hwa). In 1960, the school offer higher secondary classes, becoming the highest institution in North Muar.

Under The Education Act 1961, the school was reform into Sekolah Menengah Jenis Kebangsaan Pei Hwa (SMJK Pei Hwa), also led the student movement during the restructuring. However, mother-tongue education SHOULD NOT be abandoned. Because of the school original calibration certificates are still saved, so the council of the school decided to continue the provision of mother-tongue education, the school re-run Chinese-language school, the Pei Hwa High School soon after reformed. Earlier, the school students mostly are students whose ages were older than the average.

1963–Present 
The school faced their deepest crisis since its founding having to focus as much on economic challenges and the source of students, in addition, the school did not have its own campus, and it was just only sharing facilities with SMJK Pei Hwa. In 1971, Che Kuan Khor Moral Uplifting Society, Sungai Mati and the Chairman of Pei Hwa Alumni Association, Wu Nai Guang donated a piece of land to the school for school construction purposes. The school was moved to its current location in 1975, just across from SMJK Pei Hwa. At that time, the school had only 46 students.

With the development of the school, the number of students went up to 717 in 1987. With the rapid development of information technology, the school started their computer classes. The school became the first to establish furniture-carpentry courses in 1989. From 1996 to 1999, the carpentry class students have participated in The Malaysia Skills Competition (MSC) and won Prime Minister's Golden Hands Awards for four consecutive years. The students of the carpentry class represented Malaysia to take part in The 35th WorldSkills International Competition in Montreal, Canada in 1999. But the carpentry class suspended in 2001 for lack of finances. Science classes were reopened in 2001. In June 2004, the school brought back a 6-day school week.

On 28 July 2008, the school signed a sister school agreement with Tsun Jin High School, Kuala Lumpur. Same year, the school won the UEC (Junior) Language Category Most Improve Award in Tan Kah Kee Award 2008. On 3 December 2012, the school signed a sister school agreement with Chung Chou University of Science and Technology, Taiwan.

As China becomes stronger, the status of Chinese language is rising; the number of the school is increasing also.

Facilities 

 New Teaching Building: Ground-breaking ceremony was held on 6 October 2003 by Dato' Hajji Abdul Ghani Othman, Menteri Besar of the state of Johor. The Building was inaugurated on 13 August 2004. It is a 4-storey building totally included a new general office, 24 classrooms and air-conditioned AVA room.
 L-Shaped Building: This building was completed in 1980 and start using it in the second year; it was included 7 classrooms, 2 washrooms, 1 office, art room, sales department, and a science laboratory.
 Indoor Sports Hall: Construction start in 1987 and completion in 1989. The construction includes 1 basketball court, 2 badminton courts, some classroom and E-library.
 Wang Zha Mo Lecture Theatre: Located on the ground floor of new teaching building and start using it on 6 September 2008.
 Cai Ming Fu E-library: The library began being used on 6 September 2008 and it was extended with Dato' Yu Bing Shun's donation.
 Accommodation: Teacher's accommodation (5 separate residential units, 3 rooms each) and Lin Jin Si student apartment (a five-story, 80-unit apartment building), both were completed in 1997 and the opening ceremony took place on 27 June 1998.
 Chen Mei Niang Basketball Arena: Start using it from 1 July 2011, the opening ceremony was hosted by Dato' Hamim Samuri, Member of Parliament of Ledang District.
 Yacca Garden: It was opened on 6 September 2008.
 Recycling Center: Formerly the student activity center, originated in 1984.
 School Field and Grandstand.
 Outdoor Basketball Court.
 Chee Soon Memorial Pavilion: This memorial pavilion was built in memory of Ang Chee Soon, former headmaster of the school.

For more, please visit here.

Successive Principals

Culture and Tradition

Motto 
礼　Propriety
 This is being polite to others;
义　Righteousness
 Going with correct principles;
廉　Incorruptibility
 This is to have integrity and not to be greedily corrupted;
耻　Sense of shame
 This is not to do dishonourable things, even behind other’s backs.

Song

School Events 
 School Opening Day: This activity is an enrolment propaganda work of the school, mainly for grade five or six students of primary school. 19 August 2008, the number of participants goes up to one thousand.
 Entrance Examination: It is the school selects the outstanding talent's important way. There are many scholarships will be available to outstanding student.
 Orientation Camp: This activity is for new student, as well as the student to get more familiar with their school's important way
 Chinese New Year Celebration: As a Chinese school, the school celebrates CNY each year; it has a positive effect on inheriting and carrying forward the Chinese culture
 School Sport Meet: The first sports day began in 2007.
 Charity Bazaar: Activate which is the direct involvement and participation of every student to raise funds for school through the food sell or game booths. Such as, on 2 August 2010, Tiger-Sin Chew Chinese Education Charity Concert (in short the Tiger Sin Chew CECC) and charity bazaar were hosted at the school to raise funds for the indoor basketball court construction.
 PHHS Cultural Night / Anniversary Celebration: Activities carried out by the student present performances for their student on the importance of giving back to the community. Such as:
 On 29 August 1998, the school celebrated its 70 Anniversary.
 On 7 November 2004, three Pei Hwa school - SJK(C) Pei Hwa, SMJK Pei Hwa and Pei Hwa High School jointly celebrate the 75th anniversary celebration.
 By the middle of Aug 2005, the students from performing groups were on a tour in Kuantan.
 In Dec 2007, the students had performance at SJK(C) Chi Ming 1, Tangkak and SJK(C) Seg Hwa, Segamat.
 The theme of 80th Anniversary commemorative activities is ‘培华八十，风华再现’.
 On 1 & 2 November 2012, the school students from performing art society had performance in SJK(C) Khay Hian, Ledang and SJK(C) Chian Kuo, Ledang.

Beside the above-mentioned activities, the school also host Incentive program, Parents' Day, Teachers’ day, singing competition, trilingual speech competition and others competitions. The student associations will also hold various camps during the school holidays, focus on intellectual and spiritual to obtain fulfilment.

Organisation and Administration

Administration 
 Principal's Office
 Academic Dept.: 
 Academic Office
 Library Dept.
 Information Dept.
 Student Affairs Office: 
 Discipline Dept.
 Counseling Dept.
 General Affairs Dept.
 Co-curricular Activities Dept.: 
 Co-Curricular Dept.
 Phy. Edu. Dept.

Student Association 
 Type of Performing & Arts: 
 Orchestra Band
 Chinese Orchestra Society
 Choir
 Dancing Society
 Arts Society
 Type of Service & Uniform: 
 School Prefect
 Scout
 St. John Ambulance
 Library Club
 Xi'yu Society (as an environmental protection club)
 Audio Technical Group
 Athletics Team
 Type of Sport Varsity: 
 Basketball Varsity
 Volleyball Varsity
 Table tennis Varsity
 Badminton Varsity

School Board

Successive Chairman

Alumni Association 
Alumni association is an association of graduates or, more broadly, of former students (alumni).Currently, associated with PHHS's alumni association including:
 Persatuan Bekas Pelajar Sekolah Tinggi Pei Hwa Sg. Mati in Malay language (simplified Chinese: 培华独中校友会)
 Persatuan Murid-Murid Tua Sekolah Pei Hwa (Sg. Mati) Johor Selatan in Malay language (simplified Chinese: 培华(利丰港)柔南校友会)
 Persatuan Murid-Murid Tua Sekolah Pei Hwa Sg. Mati in Malay language (simplified Chinese: 利丰港培华校友会)
Members of these organisations are voluntarily by alumni and non-profit community organisations. The purpose and scope of work can be summarised in the following several points:
To support efforts by the school to keep alumni informed on school developments; renew friendships developed at the school;
To provide ways for alumni to network and meet each other in their communities and involve alumni in career development and job placement of students and graduates;
To organise social events, help alumni maintain connections to others alumni and their educational institution;
To assist the school’s recruitment and admissions program, further studies advisory activities, and school promotion;
To provide a venue for the exchange of ideas between alumni and the school, and encourage participation in the education development foundation;
To collect and collate information of school history, publish newsletters or magazines of the school;
To provide scholarship and study loan for the students from low income families.

Sister Schools
 Chaoyang University of Technology (2007)
 Tsun Jin High School (2008)
 Tainan University of Technology (2008)
 Tajen University (2008)
 Chung Chou University of Science and Technology (2012)

See also
 Chinese independent high school
 Education in Malaysia
 List of schools in Johor
 List of schools in Malaysia
 Chinese independent high school
 Malaysian Chinese
 Overseas Chinese
 Confucianism
 Chinese culture
 Chinese characters
 Lim Lian Geok
 UCSCAM
 UCSTAM
 The Education Act 1961

References
 Pei Hwa High School's yearbook. 
 Persatuan Murid-murid Tua Sekolah Pei Hwa (Sg. Mati) Johor Selatan's 28th Anniversary Commemorative Magazine (1981~2009) & Pei Hwa 80th Celebration Magazine (1929~2009). 
 Sin Chew Daily-Pei Hwa High School’s Related News 
 Nanyang Siang Pau-Pei Hwa High School’s Related News 
 Rise in interest in Chinese high schools 
 Over-Capacity at Independent Chinese Schools

External links

 Pei Hwa High School 

Secondary schools in Malaysia
Chinese-language schools in Malaysia
Schools in Johor
Muar District